Barandamasu Tsamiya Dan Shekarau, known as Tsamiya (or Tsamia), was the King of Kano from 1307 until his death at the hand of his half brother Usman Zamnagawa in 1343.

Reign 
He ascended to the throne after the death of his father. Though his religion was unclear, during his early years as King, Tsamiya like his father experienced a tumultuous relationship with the pagans of Kano. It is said that the pagan practice of "tchibiri" was first practiced during his reign. The usage of longhorns were also introduced to Kano during his reign.

Tsamiya was noted by the Kano Chronicles to be a fearless and courageous warrior and a noble leader. He was said to have had nine warriors who were "equal to a thousand";  Madawaki, Bajeri, Burdi-Kunkuru, Dan-kududufi-Tanko, Dan Burran Bakaki, Jarumai Garaji, Makama Gumki, Danunus Baurire, Sarkin Damargu Gabdodo and Jekafada Masab. Tsamiya formed a formidable army which struck fear into the hearts of the pagans. The pagans conceded to pay him tax to avoid war after consulting with their gods through their chief. They also offered him 200 slaves which he refused. The king then sent word to the pagans that he intended to burn their sacred tree which led to them coming out in full force with shields of elephant hide and spears to protect their gods. The pagans were however defeated and forced to flee. Tsamiya was then able to arrive at a compromise with the pagans, appointing  from among them "Sarkin Tchibiri",  "Sarkin Gazarzawa", and "Sarkin Kurmi".

"Love trausnlits love, and hate transmits hate; there is nothing between us except bows and spears and swords and shields; there is no deceit and no deceiver except he who is afraid." - Tsamiya addressing the pagans of Kano.

Personal life 
Tsamiya was the son of the 8th Sarkin Kano, Shekarau and Salmata. With Maganarku, he sired, Ali Yaji and Muhammad Bugaya who would later go on to become the 11th and 12th Rulers of Kano respectively. Yaji became the first Sultan of Kano and Bugaya the second.

Death 
Tsamiya was toppled and killed in his palace by his half brother, Usman Zamnagawa. Zamnagawa then locked the doors of the palace for a week and how he disposed of his body remains a mystery. It is not known whether he buried his brother or ate him.

Biography in the Kano Chronicle
Below is a full biography of Tsamiya from Palmer's 1908 English translation of the Kano Chronicle.

References 

14th-century monarchs in Africa 
Monarchs of Kano